Stefan Michael Newerkla (born October 7, 1972) is an Austrian linguist, Slavist and philologist.
He has taught as Professor of West Slavic Linguistics at the University of Vienna since 2004 and has been Full Member (Fellow) of the Austrian Academy of Sciences since 2018.

Biography
Born in Horn, Lower Austria, Newerkla majored in Slavonic Studies as well as English and American Studies at Vienna University (1996). He took his PhD (1998) at this very university with his doctoral thesis on diglossia in the school system of the Czech-speaking crown lands of the Habsburg Empire (1740–1918) featuring the West Bohemian district town of Plzeň. From 2000 to 2003 he was employed in a research project of the Austrian Science Fund (FWF) on linguistic contacts between Czech, Slovak and German, which he completed with his postdoctoral thesis (habilitation) on German loanwords in Czech and Slovak, highlighting their historical development, giving their first evidence in literature and presenting previous and new etymologies for them. Newerkla was appointed Professor of West Slavic Linguistics at the Alma Mater Rudolphina Vindobonensis in 2004.

He is married to Lenka Newerkla, a senior lecturer of Czech at the University of Salzburg. Together, they have three children. His brother Nikolaus Newerkla is the conductor of the award-winning ensemble Quadriga Consort.

Work
Newerkla's research interests include German-Slavic language contact, Central Europe as a linguistic area, language legislation, schooling and language education in the Habsburg Empire, and Vienna's contributions to Czech and Slovak National Renaissance. Moreover, he is co-author of textbooks and exercise books for Czech and Slovak language classes. Newerkla publishes several book series, and – together with Fedor Poljakov – the international journal Vienna Slavic Yearbook (Harrassowitz publishing house).

Currently, Newerkla is working mainly on two research areas supported by the Austrian Science Fund (FWF) – on the project "German and Slavic languages in Austria: aspects of language contact", which is part of the Special Research Programme (SFB) "German in Austria. Variation – Contact – Perception", and together with Roman Krivko and Fedor Poljakov on the international joint project "Slavic studies in exchange: Austria and Russia in 1849–1939". 

Together with Alexandra N. Lenz, Newerkla also contributes to the thematic platform on multilingualism of the Austrian Academy of Sciences (ÖAW) with the project "Aspects of Multilingualism in Austria: Competence – Usage – Attitudes". Moreover, he is founding member of the "Research Platform for the Study of Transformations and Eastern Europe".

Honors
Newerkla has been elected Member of the Academic Assembly of the Czech Academy of Sciences since 2010 and of its Science Council since 2013.

In 2017, he was awarded the Josef Dobrovský Honorary Medal for Merit in the Philological and Philosophical Sciences of the Czech Academy of Sciences.

In 2014, Newerkla was elected Corresponding Member and in 2018 Full Member (Fellow) of the Division of Humanities and the Social Sciences of the Austrian Academy of Sciences. Since 2022 he is also elected Member of the Academy Council of the Austrian Academy of Sciences.

References

External links
 Information about the researcher at the Austrian Academy of Sciences
 Information about the researcher at the Czech Academy of Sciences
 Information about the researcher at the "Research Platform for the Study of Transformations and Eastern Europe"
 Information about the researcher at the University of Vienna

1972 births
Living people
Linguists from Austria
Sociolinguists
Slavists
Historical linguists
University of Vienna alumni
Academic staff of the University of Vienna
Members of the Austrian Academy of Sciences
People associated with the Czech Academy of Sciences
People from Horn, Austria
20th-century linguists
21st-century linguists